Estadio de Vallehermoso is a multi-use stadium in Madrid, Spain.  It is currently used mostly for athletics competitions, including the Meeting de Atletismo Madrid.  The stadium has a capacity of 9,000 spectators.

References

Athletics (track and field) venues in Spain
Sports venues in Madrid
Buildings and structures in Vallehermoso neighborhood, Madrid